Glenea pieliana is a species of beetle in the family Cerambycidae. It was described by Gressitt in 1939.

References

pieliana
Beetles described in 1939